Haran Chandra Karmaker is an electrical engineer with the TECO-Westinghouse Motor Company in Round Rock, Texas. He was named a Fellow of the Institute of Electrical and Electronics Engineers (IEEE) in 2012 for his contributions to the analysis, design, and standards of large electrical machines.

References

20th-century births
Living people
Indian electrical engineers
Fellow Members of the IEEE
Year of birth missing (living people)
Place of birth missing (living people)